The term Greater Serbia or Great Serbia describes the Serbian nationalist and irredentist ideology of the creation of a Serb state which would incorporate all regions of traditional significance to Serbs, a South Slavic ethnic group, including regions outside modern-day Serbia that are partly populated by Serbs. The initial movement's main ideology (Pan-Serbism) was to unite all Serbs (or all territory historically ruled or populated by Serbs) into one state, claiming, depending on the version, different areas of many surrounding countries.

The Greater Serbian ideology includes claims to various territories aside from modern-day Serbia, including the whole of the former Yugoslavia (except Slovenia and parts of Croatia). According to historian Jozo Tomasevich, in some historical forms, Greater Serbian aspirations also include parts of Albania, Bulgaria, Hungary and Romania. Its inspiration comes from the medieval Serbian Empire that existed prior to the Ottoman conquest of the Balkans.

Historical perspective

Following the growing nationalistic tendency in Europe from the 18th century onwards, Serbia (after gaining autonomy within the Ottoman Empire in 1817) experienced a popular desire for full unification with the Serbs living in neighbouring entities. The idea of Greater Serbia was formulated in 1844 in Načertanije, a secret political draft of the Principality of Serbia made by Ilija Garašanin, a conservative statesman with Bismarckian aspirations. According to the draft, the new Serbian state could include the neighboring areas of Montenegro, Northern Albania, Bosnia and Herzegovina.

In the early 20th century, all political parties of the Kingdom of Serbia (except for the Social Democratic Party) were planning to create a Balkan Federation, and generally accepted the idea of uniting all Serbs into a single Serbian state within the federation. From the creation of the Principality until the First World War, the territory of Serbia was constantly expanding.

After the end of the Balkan Wars, the Kingdom of Serbia achieved the expansion towards the south, but there was a mixed reaction to the events, for the reason that the promises of lands gaining access to the Adriatic Sea were not fulfilled. Instead, Serbia received the territories of Vardar Macedonia that were intended to become part of the Kingdom of Bulgaria. The Serbian Army would also have to leave the coastal territories that would become part of the newly formed Principality of Albania. Along with the Austro-Hungarian Annexation of Bosnia, these events frustrated Serbian aspirations, as there was still a large number of Serbs outside of the Kingdom. Serbia's victory in the First World War served to compensate for much of this situation.

There was an open debate between the followers of the Greater Serbia doctrine that defended incorporating the Serb-majority parts of the defeated Austro-Hungarian Empire into Serbia, opposed by the ones that supported uniting not only all the Serbian lands, but also other South Slav nations into a new country. 

The Serbian Royal family of Karađorđević was set to rule this new state, called Kingdom of Serbs, Croats and Slovenes, that would be renamed to the Kingdom of Yugoslavia in 1929. Initially, the proponents of the Greater Serbia doctrine felt satisfied, since the main goal of uniting all Serbian-inhabited lands under the rule of a Serbian Monarchic dynasty was mostly achieved. During the inter-war period, the majority of Serbian politicians defended a strong centralised country, while their opponents demanded major autonomy for the regions.

During the German invasion of Yugoslavia in 1941, these tensions grew to become one of the most brutal civil wars that occurred in World War II. The Royal Government soon capitulated, and the resistance was mainly made by the Četniks (who supported the restoration of the monarchy, and the Partisans (who supported the creation of a communist Yugoslav state). The Serbs were divided into these two factions, that fought not only the Axis powers, but also each other. Other non-Serb nationalists in Yugoslavia took advantage of the situation and allied themselves with the Axis countries, regarding this moment as their historical opportunity of fulfilling their own irredentist aspirations.

After the war, victorious Partisan leader Marshal Josip Broz Tito  became the head of state of Yugoslavia until his death in 1980. During this period, the country was divided into six republics and two autonomous provinces. During this period, most followers of Greater Serbia were accused of betrayal, and subsequently incarcerated or exiled. Within the rest of the Serbian population, the vast majority became strong supporters of this new Non-Aligned Yugoslavia.

History

Obradović's Pan-Serbism

The first person to formulate the modern idea of Pan-Serbism  was Dositej Obradović (1739–1811), a writer and thinker who dedicated his writings to the "Slavoserbian people", which he described as "the inhabitants of Serbia, Bosnia, Herzegovina, Montenegro, Dalmatia, Croatia, Syrmium, Banat, and Bačka", and who he regarded as all his "Serbian brethren, regardless of their church and religion".  Other proponents of Pan-Serbism included historian Jovan Rajić and politician and lawyer Sava Tekelija, both of whom published works incorporating many of the aforementioned areas under a single umbrella name of "Serbian lands".
The concept of Pan-Serbism espoused by these three was not an imperialist one, based upon the notion of Serbian conquest, but a rationalist one.  They all believed that rationalism would overcome the barriers of religion that separated the Slavs into Orthodox Christians, Catholics, and Muslims, uniting the peoples as one nation.

The idea of a unification and homogenization by force was propounded by Petar II Petrović-Njegoš (1813–1851).

Garašanin's Načertanije

Some authors claim that the roots of the Greater Serbian ideology can be traced back to Serbian minister Ilija Garašanin's Načertanije (1844). Načertanije (Начертаније) was influenced by "Conseils sur la conduite a suivre par la Serbie", a document written by Polish Prince Adam Czartoryski in 1843 and the revised version by Polish ambassador to Serbia, Franjo Zach, "Zach's Plan".

The work claimed lands that were inhabited by Bulgarians, Macedonians, Albanians, Montenegrins, Bosnians, Hungarians and Croats as part of Greater Serbia. Garašanin's plan also included methods of spreading Serbian influence in the claimed lands. He proposed ways to influence Croats and Slavic Muslims, who Garašanin regarded as "Serbs of Catholic faith" and "Serbs of Islamic faith". The document also emphasized the necessity of cooperation between the Balkan nations and it advocated that the Balkans should be governed by the nations from the Balkans.

This plan was kept secret until 1906 and has been interpreted by some as a blueprint for Serbian national unification, with the primary concern of strengthening Serbia's position by inculcating Serbian and pro-Serbian national ideology in all surrounding peoples that are considered to be devoid of national consciousness. Because Načertanije was a secret document until 1906, it could not have affected national consciousness at the popular level. However, some scholars suggest that from the second half of the nineteenth century to the outbreak of World War I, “leading political groups and social strata in Serbia were thoroughly imbued with the ideas in the Nacertanije and differed only in intensity of feeling and political conceptualization”. Political insecurity, more so than Yugoslavism or Serbian nationalism, appeared to be the prevailing reasoning behind the idea of expanding Serbian borders. The document is one of the most contested of nineteenth-century Serbian history, with rival interpretations. Some scholars argue that Garašanin was an inclusive Yugoslavist, while others maintain that he was an exclusive Serbian nationalist seeking a Greater Serbia.

Vuk Karadžić's Pan-Serbism

The most notable Serbian linguist of the 19th century, Vuk Karadžić, was a follower of the view that all south Slavs that speak the Shtokavian dialect (of Serbo-Croatian) were Serbs, speaking the Serbian language. As this definition implied that large areas of continental Croatia, Dalmatia, and Bosnia and Herzegovina, including areas inhabited by Roman Catholics – Vuk Karadžić is considered by some to be the progenitor of the Greater Serbia program. More precisely, Karadžić was the shaper of modern secular Serbian national consciousness, with the goal of incorporating all indigenous Shtokavian speakers (Eastern Orthodox, Catholic, Muslim) into one, modern Serbian nation. German historian Michael Weithmann 
considers that Karadžić expressed dangerous ideological and political idea in scientific shape ie that all southern Slavs are Serbs while Czech historian Jan Rychlik consider that Karadžić became a propagator of greater Serbian ideology and uttered a theory according to which are all Yugoslav people talking shtokavian dialect Serbs.

This view is not shared by Andrew Baruch Wachtel (Making a Nation, Breaking a Nation) who sees him as a partisan of South Slav unity, albeit in a limited sense, in that his linguistic definition emphasized what united South Slavs rather than the religious differences that had earlier divided them. However, one might argue that such a definition is very partisan: Karadžić himself eloquently and explicitly professed that his aim was to unite all native Shtokavian speakers whom he identified as Serbs. Therefore, Vuk Karadžić's central linguistic-political aim was the growth of the realm of Serbdom according to his ethnic-linguistic ideas and not a unity of any sort between Serbs and the other nations.

Balkan Wars

The idea of reclaiming historic Serbian territory has been put into action several times during the 19th and 20th centuries, notably in Serbia's southward expansion in the Balkan Wars. Serbia claimed "historical rights" to the possession of Macedonia, acquired by Stephen Dušan in fourteenth century.

Serbia gained significant territorial expansion in the Balkan Wars and almost doubled its territory, with the areas populated mostly by non-Serbs (Albanians, Bulgarians, Turks and others). Serbia's most important goal of the Balkan Wars was access to the open sea. so the Kingdom of Serbia occupied most of the interior of Albania and Albania's Adriatic coast. A series of massacres of Albanians in the Balkan Wars were committed by the Serbian and Montenegrin Army. According to the Report of the International Commission on the Balkan Wars, Serbia consider annexed territories "as a dependency, a sort of conquered colony, which these conquerors might administer at their good pleasure". Newly acquired territories were subjected to military government, and were not included in Serbia's constitutional system. The opposition press demanded the rule of law for the population of the annexed territories and the extension of the constitution of the Kingdom of Serbia to these regions.

The Royal Serbian Army captured Durazzo on 29 November 1912 without any resistance. Orthodox Christian metropolitan of Durrës Jakob gave a particularly warm welcome to the new authorities. Due to Jakob's intervention to the Serbian authorities several Albanian guerrilla units were saved and avoided execution.

However, the army of the Kingdom of Serbia retreated from Durrës in April 1913 under pressure of the naval fleet of Great Powers, but it remained in other parts of Albania for the next two months.

Black Hand

The secret military society called Unity or Death, popularly known as the Black Hand, headed by Serbian colonel Dragutin Dimitrijević Apis, which took an active and militant stance on the issue of a Greater Serbian state. This organization is believed to have been responsible for numerous atrocities following the Balkan Wars in 1913.

World War I and the creation of Yugoslavia

By 1914 the Greater Serbian concept was eventually replaced by the Yugoslav Pan-Slavic movement. The change in approach was meant as a means to gain support of other Slavs which neighboured Serbs who were also occupied by Austria-Hungary. The intention to create a south Slav or "Yugoslav" state was expressed in the Niš declaration by Serbian prime minister Nikola Pašić in 1914, as well as in Serbia's regent Alexander's statement in 1916. The documents showed that Serbia would pursue a policy that would integrate all territory that contained Serbs and southern Slavs (except Bulgarians), including Croats and Slovenes.

The Treaty of London (1915) of the allies would assign to Serbia the territories of Bosnia and Herzegovina, Srem, Bačka, Slavonia (against Italian objections) and northern Albania (to be divided with Montenegro).

After the First World War, Serbia achieved a maximalist nationalist aspirations with the unification of the south Slavic regions of Austria-Hungary and Montenegro, into a Serbian-dominated Kingdom of Yugoslavia.

During the Kingdom of Serbs, Croats and Slovenes, the government of the Kingdom pursued a linguistic Serbisation policy towards the Macedonians in Macedonia,  then called "Southern Serbia" (unofficially) or "Vardar Banovina" (officially). The dialects spoken in this region were referred to as dialects of Serbo-Croatian.
Either way, those southern dialects were suppressed with regards education, military and other national activities, and their usage was punishable.

World War II and Moljević's Homogenous Serbia

During World War II, the Serbian royalist Yugoslav Army in the Fatherland which was headed by General Draža Mihailović attempted to define its vision of a postwar future. One of its intellectuals was the Bosnian Serb nationalist Stevan Moljević who, in 1941, proposed in a paper which was titled "Homogenous Serbia" that an even larger Greater Serbia should be created, incorporating not only Bosnia and much of Croatia but also chunks of Romania, Bulgaria, Albania and Hungary in areas where Serbs don't represent a significant minority. In the territories which were under their military control, the Chetniks waged an ethnic cleansing campaign against ethnic Croats and Bosnian Muslims.

It was a point of discussion at a Chetnik congress which was held in the village of Ba in central Serbia in January 1944; however, Moljević's ideas were never put into practice due to the Chetniks' defeat by Josip Broz Tito's Partisans (a predominantly Serb movement which became multi-ethnic by this time) and it is difficult to assess how influential they were, due to the lack of records from the Ba congress. Nonetheless, Moljević's core idea—that Serbia is defined by the pattern of Serb settlement, irrespective of existing national borders—was to remain an underlying theme of the Greater Serbian ideal.

Role in the dissolution of Yugoslavia

SANU Memorandum

Memorandum of the Serbian Academy of Sciences and Arts (1986) was the single most important document to set into motion the pan-Serbian movement of the late 1980s which led to Slobodan Milošević's rise to power and the subsequent Yugoslav wars. The authors of the Memorandum included the most influential Serbian intellectuals, among them: Dobrica Ćosić, Pavle Ivić, Antonije Isaković, Dušan Kanazir, Mihailo Marković, Miloš Macura, Dejan Medaković, Miroslav Pantić, Nikola Pantić, Ljubiša Rakić, Radovan Samardžić, Miomir Vukobratović, Vasilije Krestić, Ivan Maksimović, Kosta Mihailović, Stojan Čelić and Nikola Čobelić. Philosopher Christopher Bennett characterized the memorandum as "an elaborate, if crude, conspiracy theory." The memorandum claimed systematic discrimination against Serbs and Serbia culminating with the allegation that the Serbs of Kosovo and Metohija were being subjected to genocide. According to Bennett, despite most of these claims being obviously absurd, the memorandum was merely one of several similar polemics published at the time.

The Memorandum's defenders claim that far from calling for a breakup of Yugoslavia on Greater Serbian lines, the document was in favor of Yugoslavia. Its support for Yugoslavia was however conditional on fundamental changes to end what the Memorandum argued was the discrimination against Serbia which was inbuilt into the Yugoslav constitution. The chief of these changes was abolition of the autonomy of Kosovo and Vojvodina. According to Norman Cigar, because the changes were unlikely to be accepted passively, the implementation of the Memorandum's program would only be possible by force.

Milošević's rise to power

With the rise to power of Milošević the Memorandum's discourse became mainstream in Serbia. According to Bennett, Milošević used a rigid control of the media to organize a propaganda campaign in which the Serbs were the victims and stressed the need to readjust Yugoslavia due to the alleged bias against Serbia. This was then followed by Milošević's anti-bureaucratic revolution in which the provincial governments of Vojvodina and Kosovo and the Republican government of Montenegro, were overthrown giving Milošević the dominating position of four votes out of eight in Yugoslavia's collective presidency. Milošević had achieved such a dominant position for Serbia because, according to Bennett, the old communist authorities had failed to stand up to him. During August 1988, supporters of the Anti-Bureaucratic Revolution were reported to have shouted Greater Serbia themed chants of "Montenegro is Serbia!".

Croatia and Slovenia denounced the demands by Milošević for a more centralized system of government in Yugoslavia and they began to demand that Yugoslavia be made a full multi-party confederal state. Milošević claimed that he opposed a confederal system but also declared that should a confederal system be created, the external borders of Serbia would be an "open question", insinuating that his government would pursue creating a Greater Serbia if Yugoslavia was decentralized.Milosevic stated: "These are the questions of borders, essential state questions. The borders, as you know, are always dictated by the strong, never by weak ones."

By this point several opposition parties in Serbia were openly calling for a Greater Serbia, rejecting the then existing boundaries of the Republics as the artificial creation of Tito's partisans. These included Šešelj's Serbian Radical Party, claiming that the recent changes had rectified most of the anti-Serb bias that the Memorandum had alleged. Milošević supported the groups calling for a Greater Serbia, insisting on the demand for "all Serbs in one state". The Socialist Party of Serbia appeared to be defenders of the Serb people in Yugoslavia. Serbian president Slobodan Milošević, who was also the leader of the Socialist Party of Serbia, repeatedly stated that all Serbs should enjoy the right to be included in Serbia. Opponents and critics of Milošević claimed that "Yugoslavia could be that one state but the threat was that, should Yugoslavia break up, then Serbia under Milošević would carve out a Greater Serbia".

Major changes took place in Yugoslavia in 1990 when free elections brought opposition parties to power in Croatia and Slovenia. In 1990, power had seeped away from the federal government to the republics and were deadlocked over the future of Yugoslavia with the Slovene and Croatian republics seeking a confederacy and Serbia a stronger federation. Gow states, "it was the behavior of Serbia that added to the Croatian and Slovene Republic's belief that no accommodation was possible with the Serbian Republic's leadership". The last straw was on 15 May 1991 when the outgoing Serb president of the collective presidency along with the Serb satellites on the presidency blocked the succession of the Croatian representative Stjepan Mesić as president. According to Gow, from this point on Yugoslavia de facto "ceased to function".

Virovitica–Karlovac–Karlobag line

The Virovitica–Karlovac–Karlobag line ( / Virovitica–Karlovac–Karlobag linija) is a hypothetical boundary that describes the western extent of an irredentist nationalist Serbian state. It defines everything east of this line, Karlobag–Ogulin–Karlovac–Virovitica, as a part of Serbia, while the west of it would be within Slovenia, and all which might remain of Croatia. Such a boundary would give the majority of the territory of the Socialist Federal Republic of Yugoslavia to the Serbs.

This line was frequently referenced by Serbian politician Vojislav Šešelj.

A greater Serbian state was supported for economical as well as irredentist reasons, as it would give Serbia a large coastline, heavy industries, agricultural farmland, natural resources and all of the crude oil (mostly found in the Pannonian Plain, and particularly in the Socialist Republic of Croatia). There were various Serbian politicians associated with Slobodan Milošević in the early 1990s who publicly espoused such views: Mihalj Kertes, Milan Babić, Milan Martić, Vojislav Šešelj, Stevan Mirković.

In his speeches and books, Šešelj claimed that all of the population of these areas are in fact ethnic Serbs, of Orthodox, Roman Catholic or Muslim faith. However, outside of Šešelj's Serbian Radical Party, the line as such was never promoted in recent Serbian political life.

Yugoslav wars

The war crimes charges against Milošević are based on the allegation that he sought the establishment of a "Greater Serbia". Prosecutors at the Hague argued that "the indictments were all part of a common scheme, strategy or plan on the part of the accused [Milošević] to create a 'Greater Serbia', a centralized Serbian state encompassing the Serb-populated areas of Croatia and Bosnia and all of Kosovo, and that this plan was to be achieved by forcibly removing non-Serbs from large geographical areas through the commission of the crimes charged in the indictments. Although the events in Kosovo were separated from those in Croatia and Bosnia by more than three years, they were no more than a continuation of that plan, and they could only be understood completely by reference to what had happened in Croatia and Bosnia."

The Hague Trial Chamber found that the strategic plan of the Bosnian Serb leadership consisted of "a plan to link Serb-populated areas in BiH together, to gain control over these areas and to create a separate Bosnian Serb state, from which most non-Serbs would be permanently removed". It also found that media in certain areas focused only on Serb Democratic Party policy and reports from Belgrade became more prominent, including the presentation of extremist views and promotion of the concept of a Greater Serbia, just as in other parts of Bosnia and Herzegovina the concept of a Greater Croatia was openly advocated.

Vuk Drašković, leader of the Serbian Renewal Movement, called for the creation of a Greater Serbia which would include Serbia, Kosovo, Vojvodina, Macedonia and Montenegro, as well as regions within Bosnia and Herzegovina and Croatia with high concentrations of Serbs. About 160,000 Croats were expelled from territories Serbian forces sought to control.

Much of the fighting in the Yugoslav Wars of the 1990s was the result of an attempt to keep Serbs unified. Mihailo Marković, the Vice President of the Main Committee of Serbia's Socialist Party, rejected any solution that would make Serbs outside Serbia a minority. He proposed establishing a federation consisting of Serbia, Montenegro, Bosnia and Herzegovina, Macedonia and Serbs residing in the Serbian Autonomous Region of Krajina, Slavonia, Baranja, and Srem.

Later developments 

The International Criminal Tribunal for the Former Yugoslavia (ICTY) accused Slobodan Milošević and other Serb leaders of committing crimes against humanity which included murder, forcible population transfer, deportation and "persecution on political, racial or religious grounds." Tribunal prosecutor's office has accused Milosevic of "the gravest violations of human rights in Europe since the Second World War and genocide."

Historian Sima Ćirković stated that grumblings about Greater Serbia and pointing fingers at Garašanin's Načertanije and the "Memorandum" is not helping to solve the existing problems and that it is an abuse of history.

Serbian academic Čedomir Popov considers that the allegations of "Greater Serbian intentions" are often used for politically anti-Serbian interests and that they are factually incorrect. Popov stated that throughout the Serbian history there never was nor ever will be a Greater Serbia.

In 2008, Aleksandar Vučić, a former member of the Serbian Radical Party, which advocated the creation of a Greater Serbia, stated that Šešelj's vision of Greater Serbian was unrealistic and that idea of Greater Serbia was unrealistic at the moment because of balance of power held by the great powers.

Recent events

In 2011, there was a movement calling for the unification of Republika Srpska with Serbia.
This idea is detested by Federation of Bosnia and Herzegovina where it is seen as an act of breaking the Dayton Agreement, while Serbs see it as an example of self-determination.

Serbian World 
Ever since 2020, a new term called Serbian World (Serbian: Srpski svet) came to use among prominent Serbian politicians such as Aleksandar Vulin. Regional media and political commentators saw this term as a substitute for earlier "Greater Serbia".

See also

Arbitration Commission of the Peace Conference on Yugoslavia
Anti-Croat sentiment
Anti-Serb sentiment
Greater Bosnia
Greater Croatia

References

Literature

External links

From Project Rastko website:
Ilija Garasanin's "Nacertanije": A Reasessment, including full translation of the document to English language
Full Memorandum SANU (73 pages)  
Memorandum of the Serbian Academy of Sciences and Arts – Answers to Criticism
From Croatian Information Centre website:
"Greater Serbia – from Ideology to Aggression" , book of excerpts of influential Serbians supporting the idea
Henri Pozzi:Black Hand Over Europe 
Memorandum of the Serbian Academy of Sciences and Arts 
Stevan Moljević:Homogenous Serbia 
An end to the myth of "Greater Serbia"? A rebuttal by a grandson of the man who coined the term 
International sources
The policy creating greater Serbia (UN report)
Greater Serbia in modern times: Paul Garde's opinion
Bosnia: a single country or an apple of discord? , Bosnian Institute, 12 May 2006
Serbian-Greek Confederation as proposed by Slobodan Milošević and Karadžić
The End of Greater Serbia By Nicholas Wood-The New York Times 
Globalizing the Holocaust: A Jewish 'useable past' in Serbian Nationalism – David MacDonald, University of Otago 

 
Serbian nationalism in Bosnia and Herzegovina
Serbian nationalism in Croatia
Serbian nationalism in Kosovo
Serbian nationalism in Montenegro
Serbian nationalism in North Macedonia
Political terminology of Serbia